The  is a public-private transport company that operates the Aoimori Railway Line in Aomori Prefecture, Japan. Its headquarters are located in the city of Aomori. The government of Aomori Prefecture and the city of Aomori are the primary shareholders of the company.

History
The Aoimori Railway Company was founded on 25 May 2001. Following the beginning of Tōhoku Shinkansen services between Morioka Station and Hachinohe Station on 1 December 2002, the company began operating services along the former Tōhoku Main Line – the corresponding section of which was subsequently renamed as the Aoimori Railway Line –  between Metoki Station and Hachinohe Station. When the shinkansen was extended north from Hachinohe to Shin-Aomori Station on 4 December 2010, the company assumed control of the bypassed section of the Tōhoku Main Line between Hachinohe Station and Aomori Station and added it to the Aoimori Railway Line.

References

Companies based in Aomori Prefecture
Railway companies of Japan
Japanese companies established in 2001